The harlequin tree frog (Rhacophorus pardalis) is a species of frog in the family Rhacophoridae found in Brunei, Indonesia, Malaysia, Thailand, and the Philippines. Its natural habitats are subtropical or tropical moist lowland forest, subtropical or tropical moist montane forest, freshwater marshes, and intermittent freshwater marshes. It is threatened by habitat loss.

References

External links

Amphibian and Reptiles of Peninsular Malaysia - Rhacophorus pardalis

Rhacophorus
Fauna of Brunei
Amphibians of Malaysia
Amphibians of Indonesia
Amphibians of the Philippines
Amphibians of Thailand
Amphibians of Borneo
Taxonomy articles created by Polbot
Amphibians described in 1858
Taxa named by Albert Günther